Elijah Horr House is a historic home located at Orleans in Jefferson County, New York. It is a two-story, five-bay structure built about 1835 and is constructed of local limestone with Federal style detailing.  The center entrance features an elliptical segmented arch with a large keystone.  Also on the property is a wood hen house constructed about 1870.

It was listed on the National Register of Historic Places in 1996.

References

Houses on the National Register of Historic Places in New York (state)
Federal architecture in New York (state)
Houses completed in 1835
Houses in Jefferson County, New York
National Register of Historic Places in Jefferson County, New York